Grégory Beron (born 31 July 1989) is a retired French ice hockey defenceman who played for Corsaires de Dunkerque of the FFHG Division 1.

References

External links

1989 births
Living people
French ice hockey defencemen